Dominic Augustin Hall (January 1, 1765 – December 19, 1820) was chief justice of the Louisiana Supreme Court, the Chief United States circuit judge of the United States Circuit Court for the Fifth Circuit and a United States District Judge of the United States District Court for the District of Orleans and the United States District Court for the District of Louisiana.

Education and career

Born on January 1, 1765, in the Province of South Carolina, British America, Hall entered private practice in Charleston, South Carolina starting in 1789.

Federal judicial service

Hall received a recess appointment from President Thomas Jefferson on July 1, 1801, to the United States Circuit Court for the Fifth Circuit, to the new Chief Judge seat authorized by 2 Stat. 89. He was nominated to the same position by President Jefferson on January 6, 1802. He was confirmed by the United States Senate on January 26, 1802, and received his commission the same day. His service terminated on July 1, 1802, due to abolition of the court.

Hall was nominated by President Jefferson on November 30, 1804, to the United States District Court for the District of Orleans, to a new seat authorized by 2 Stat. 283. He was confirmed by the Senate on November 30, 1804, and received his commission on December 11, 1804. His service terminated on April 30, 1812, due to abolition of the court.

Hall was nominated by President James Madison on May 27, 1812, to the United States District Court for the District of Louisiana, to a new seat authorized by 2 Stat. 701. He was confirmed by the Senate on May 28, 1812, and received his commission on June 1, 1812. His service terminated on February 22, 1813, due to his resignation.

Hall was nominated by President Madison on May 29, 1813, to a seat on the United States District Court for the District of Louisiana vacated by himself. He was confirmed by the Senate on June 1, 1813, and received his commission the same day. His service terminated on December 19, 1820, due to his death in New Orleans, Louisiana.

Other service

Hall was the chief justice of the Louisiana Supreme Court from February 1813, until May 1813.

Conflict with Andrew Jackson

In 1815, after it was learned that a treaty ending the War of 1812 had been signed, Hall challenged Andrew Jackson's continuing enforcement of martial law. Hall was particularly incensed that Jackson had executed six militiamen for departing early from their enlistments. Jackson threw Hall in jail for daring to question his rule. After martial law ended, Hall fined Jackson $1,000 for contempt of court. Nearly 30 years later, in 1844, Congress voted to repay the fine to Jackson, with interest.

References

External links
 Dominic Augustin Hall at the Federal Judicial Center's Biographical Directory of Article III Federal Judges
 Dominic Hall in the Louisiana Historical Association's Dictionary of Louisiana Biography

1765 births
1820 deaths
18th-century American lawyers
19th-century American judges
Chief Justices of the Louisiana Supreme Court
Judges of the United States circuit courts
Judges of the United States District Court for the District of Louisiana
South Carolina lawyers
United States federal judges appointed by James Madison
United States federal judges appointed by Thomas Jefferson
United States territorial judges